Rechter is a surname. Notable people with the surname include:

Dafna Rechter (born 1965), Israeli actress and singer
Yaakov Rechter (1924-2001), Israeli architect
Yoni Rechter (born 1951), Israeli musician
Zeev Rechter (1899-1960), Israeli architect

Hebrew-language surnames